The dwarf sawfish or Queensland sawfish, Pristis clavata, is a sawfish of the family Pristidae, found in tropical Australia. This endangered species is the smallest species in its family.

Description

It has broad, triangular pectoral fins and large, upright dorsal fins. The first dorsal fin is located directly above, or slightly behind, the origins of the pelvic fins, and the caudal fin has a very small lower lobe. The snout is broad and flat and is elongated into a rostrum with around twenty pairs of rostral teeth. This fish is usually greenish-brown, or occasionally yellowish-brown, on its dorsal surface, and whitish underneath.

Distribution and habitat
The dwarf sawfish is native to the western and central Indo-Pacific region and historically had a much wider range than it does now. Its present confirmed range is from the Cape York Peninsula, Queensland, to the northern Pilbara region of Western Australia. A recorded sighting from the Canary Islands was probably of a different species. It typically inhabits inshore waters, estuaries, tidal mudflats and sometimes the lowest reaches of rivers.

Ecology

This sawfish feeds mainly on fish, but also eats molluscs and crustaceans. The rostrum has large numbers of pores adapted for electroreception and is probably also used to manipulate prey. Its sensory input helps the fish move about in the muddy waters in which it often lives. At high tide the fish tend to forage and rest among the mangroves.

Little is known of the breeding habits of the dwarf sawfish. The fish are ovoviviparous with the developing embryos feeding on the yolks of their eggs. Maximum longevity in this species is estimated to be forty-eight years.

Status
The dwarf sawfish is protected in Australian waters, but elsewhere in the world, sawfishes are harvested for their meat, fins, rostrums and oil. The main threat facing the dwarf sawfish is being caught as bycatch in gillnets and trawl nets. That this is the cause of declining numbers is demonstrated by the fact that populations are declining fastest in heavily fished areas. The International Union for Conservation of Nature has assessed the conservation status of this fish as "endangered". There is a need for education of fishermen about safe release practices and how to manage their fisheries. However, the threats are continuing, and there is no reason to believe that the population of dwarf sawfish is recovering from previous declines.

Due to the decrease in the number of individuals, this species is rarely stored in aquariums, and as of 2021, 2 individuals (1 males 1 females) are captivity only in the Japanese public aquariums Aqua Park Shinagawa.

See also

List of threatened rays

References

5. (Sensory Systems in Sawfishes. 1. The Ampullae of Lorenzini) https://www.researchgate.net/profile/Barbara_Wueringer/publication/51559323_Sensory_systems_in_sawfishes._1._The_ampullae_of_Lorenzini/links/09e415091dacec5f51000000.pdf

External links

Species Description of Pristis clavata at www.shark-references.com

Pristis
dwarf sawfish
dwarf sawfish
ESA endangered species